Temefos or temephos (trade name Abate) is an organophosphate larvicide used to treat water infested with disease-carrying insects including mosquitoes, midges, and black fly larvae.

As with other organophosphates, temephos affects the central nervous system through inhibition of cholinesterase.  In larvae, this results in death before reaching the adult stage.

In the developing world where the vector-borne disease dengue fever is endemic, temephos is widely used and applied by both private and public pest control in areas of standing water where the Aedes aegypti mosquito breeds in order to reduce the population of this disease-carrying insect.  Temephos is also used in the Guinea worm eradication program to kill water fleas that carry guinea worm larvae.

Resistance to temephos by A. aegypti has been seen in Brazil.  The Brazilian Aedes aegypti resistance monitoring program detected temephos resistance in A. aegypti populations from several localities in the country in 1999 (Funasa 2000, Lima et al. 2003).  In 1999, mosquitoes from the city of Rio de Janeiro were already resistant to temephos.

References

External links
 NIOSH Pocket Guide to Chemical Hazards
 International Chemical Safety Cards
 Official product site

Bibliography 
 Dejous C & Elouard J.M (1977) Action de l'abate sur les invertébérs aquatiques ; cinétique de décrochement à court et moyen terme (in French).

Acetylcholinesterase inhibitors
Organophosphate insecticides
Thioethers
Organothiophosphate esters